The 2001 season is the 50th year in Guangzhou Football Club's existence, their 36th season in the Chinese football league and the 10th season in the professional football league.

2000
Guangzhou Apollo